The Anti-Federalist League was a small cross-party organisation in the United Kingdom, formed in 1991 to campaign against the Maastricht Treaty. It is mainly remembered now as the forerunner of the UK Independence Party.

The main founder of the Anti-Federalist League was Alan Sked, lecturer at the London School of Economics, leading figure in the Bruges Group and former official of the Liberal Party. The Maastricht Treaty, which greatly increased the powers of the European Commission, was widely unpopular according to opinion polls, but all three of the main parties had pledged to support its ratification in the House of Commons. Sked and others felt that this denied voters a say on a crucial constitutional issue. Running AFL candidates was supposed to make good this shortfall in the democratic process. Another founder was Helen Szamuely. Members of the League included future UKIP leaders Nigel Farage and Gerard Batten.

The League stood seventeen candidates in the 1992 general election, but failed to make any impact or attract any press attention.  It lost all its deposits.  The following year, Alan Sked represented it in by-elections in Newbury (gaining 1% of the vote) and Christchurch (1.6%).

Amidst extraordinary scenes in the House of Commons, and in the teeth of intense opposition from a minority of Conservative MPs known as the Maastricht Rebels, the Maastricht Treaty finally passed into law. Many members of the Anti-Federalist League concluded that with the Treaty in place, the only option for anti-federalists was to campaign for complete British withdrawal from the European Union.  To this end, Sked and others met in late 1993 to set up a full-blown political party: the UK Independence Party. Not all members of the League followed Sked into the new organisation, but the party did effectively supersede the League, which ceased to exist.

See also

Anti-Federalist League election results

References

1991 establishments in the United Kingdom
1993 disestablishments in the United Kingdom
Euroscepticism in the United Kingdom
Defunct political parties in the United Kingdom
Political parties established in 1991
Political parties disestablished in 1993